Jay Grenville Tapp is a Canadian former backstroke swimmer.

Tapp is the son of former Swimming Canada president Larry Tapp and the father of Olympic swimmer Jake Tapp.

At the 1978 Commonwealth Games in Edmonton, Tapp swam the backstroke leg of Canada's gold medal-winning 4 x 100 metre medley relay team and also secured a bronze medal in the 100 metre backstroke event.

Tapp swam in the 100 metre backstroke at the 1978 World Swimming Championships in West Berlin. He was due to swim in the heats of the  medley relay but got sent home early by coach Don Talbot, who deemed that he and teammate George Nagy were under the influence of alcohol after they arrived back late to the hotel.

References

External links

Year of birth missing (living people)
Living people
Canadian male backstroke swimmers
Commonwealth Games gold medallists for Canada
Commonwealth Games bronze medallists for Canada
Commonwealth Games medallists in swimming
Medallists at the 1978 Commonwealth Games
Swimmers at the 1978 Commonwealth Games